The Sepon River (Lao: Se Pon) is a small river at Lao Bảo border area of Quảng Trị Province, Vietnam and Savannakhet Province of Laos. It forms a border between Vietnam and Laos. One side of the river belongs to Vietnam and other belongs to Laos. 

The Sepon River is one metre deep and approximately 100 m wide. The water is fresh and clean in summer because it is not near any industry. Surrounding the Sepon River is jungle.

The Sepon River belongs to Hướng Hóa District of Vietnam and Savannakhet Province of Laos. Therefore, it is a main artery for the two provinces near there (Lao Bảo and the city of Savannakhet). It is used for buying and exchange trade and commerce in Lao Bảo and Savan of Laos. Every day, there are several motor boat to-and-fro here for supplying goods coming to Lao Bảo town. The Sepon is regarded as a trade bridge linking Vietnam and Thailand, in order to exchange trade. In addition, one can come cross into Laos from Vietnam border by motorboat, which takes about 30 minutes to the Savan Province of Laos.

Rivers of Quảng Trị province
Rivers of Laos
International rivers of Asia
Laos–Vietnam border
Rivers of Vietnam